Amador may refer to:
Amador City, California, a small city in the Sierra Nevada
Amador County, California, the surrounding county
Dublin, California, formerly called Amador